The Conrow Fire was a wildfire that burned seven miles northeast of Whitehall in the Beaverhead-Deerlodge National Forest in Montana in the United States. The fire was started by a lightning strike on August 24, 2017. It has burned  and has threatened homes, ranches and mining operations in the area.

Events

The Conrow Fire was started by a lightning strike on August 24, 2017 on private land seven miles northeast of Whitehall, Montana. The fire threatened 25 structures, including cellphone towers, mining areas, homes and cattle ranches along the Highway 69 corridor. 

By the next day, the fire threatened one more structure, totaling 26 and structure assessments began in the Antelope Lane area. On August 28, a containment date of September 2 was set and two Chinook helicopters joined the firefight, dropping water on the fire. The fire began to dramatically impact air quality, with the help of other fires burning in the area, including creating  the worst air quality day in two years in Butte. Crews changed the full containment date from September 1 to September 6.

References

External links
 

2017 Montana wildfires
Beaverhead-Deerlodge National Forest